Morecambe Church Lads' Brigade at Drill is a 1901 British short  silent documentary film, directed by James Kenyon and Sagar Mitchell, showing the parade drill of the Morecambe Church Lads' Brigade on 3 July 1901. The film, which was premiered at the Winter Gardens in Morecambe on the same day it was filmed, was popular and went on to be  shown at other venues in the North of England.

References

External links

British black-and-white films
British silent short films
Films directed by Mitchell & Kenyon
1900s documentary films
Black-and-white documentary films
British documentary films